Park flyers are a class of small, primary electric powered radio controlled aircraft. The smallest class of park flyers are called micro planes and can be used in an enclosed area such as a gymnasium or a living room, while larger park flyers are used at park flyer sites. Models with low flying speed are more susceptible to wind and turbulence. Park flyers weigh no more than 2 pounds, allowing park flyers to have a speed limit of less than half of the current wind speed. 

Park flyers are a cost-effective and convenient way for beginners to get involved in the hobby of RC flight. The materials that make up the aircraft are repairable even after severe crash damages. Their small-sized and quiet operation allows them to be flown in residential areas. There are clubs to support beginners and provide information regarding potential flight locations.

Types of park flyers 
Ready-to-fly (RTF) park flyers require no construction or installation. Users may need to perform basic assembling to fly the aircraft. Almost ready to fly (ARF) park flyers require construction and installation of different parts by the users.

Advanced electronic and material technologies have aided in the development of high-performance, park flyer sized "3D-flyers", or fully aerobatic aircraft capable of extreme high g maneuvers and nose-up hovering.

A park flyer named the SQUIRT has been entitled as "America's park flyer" due to its high travelling distance of over 26,000 miles within the United States of America and being flown by over 700 different pilots. This was known as the Wings Across America 2008 adventure.

Safety 
Certain park flyers (especially small delta-wings) can fly at a dangerous speed which might cause injuries to passers-by. A standard precaution is keeping an appropriate distance from the public.  The Academy of Model Aeronautics recommends a minimum safe distance of at least 50 feet from any spectators other than the pilot.

See also
 Grand Wing Servo-Tech
 UltraFly Model Corporation
 RC Aircraft Kit Manufacturers

References

Radio-controlled aircraft
Model aircraft